Tivis is an unincorporated community in Dickenson County, Virginia, in the United States.

History
A post office was established at Tivis in 1916, and remained in operation until it was discontinued in 1958. The community was named for Tivis Colley, an early postmaster's father.

References

Unincorporated communities in Dickenson County, Virginia
Unincorporated communities in Virginia